Taulia Tagovailoa (born February 26, 2000) is an American football quarterback for the Maryland Terrapins. He holds the Maryland single-season and all time school records for completions and passing yards and a share of the touchdowns record. He is also the career passing yards leader and career touchdown passes leader for Maryland. He is the brother of professional football quarterback Tua Tagovailoa.

College career

Alabama

2019
Tagovailoa spent his true freshman season at Alabama in 2019 as a backup to his older brother, Tua Tagovailoa, and Mac Jones. He saw his first collegiate action in the season opener against Duke but did not record any stats. On September 21, 2019, Tagovailoa completed his first career pass for a gain of 20 yards against Southern Miss, finishing 1-for-1 on the day. He entered in the third quarter against Arkansas on October 26, 2019, for his most extensive action to date, finishing 6-of-8 passing for 45 yards while adding one rush for no gain. He came in late for the Tide against Mississippi State, handing the ball off to run out the clock in Starkville. Tagovailoa finished 2-of-3 for 35 yards against Western Carolina with his first career touchdown. He finished the season nine of 12 for 100 yards and one touchdown.

Maryland

2020
On May 15, 2020, Tagovailoa announced he would be transferring to the University of Maryland.

He started in all four games in which he played, only missing the final game vs. Rutgers. In his 4 games, he led Maryland to a 2-2 record, in which he beat Penn State and Minnesota. He broke the 5 game losing streak Maryland had against Penn State. He threw 75-of-122 passing for 1,011 yards, seven touchdowns and seven interceptions. He ranked top five in the Big Ten in multiple passing categories: first in yards per completion (13.48), second in passing efficiency (138.5), second in yards per pass attempt (8.29), third in passing yards per game (252.8) and third in total offense (263.8). At the end of the season, Tagovailoa was named All-Big Ten Honorable Mention.

2021
Tagovailoa returned to Maryland as the team's starting quarterback in 2021, starting in all 13 games and again earning All-Big Ten Honorable Mention. He led Maryland to the program's first winning season since 2014 and the program's first bowl bid since 2016, beating West Virginia, Howard, Illinois, Kent State, Indiana, Rutgers, and Virginia Tech. He broke the 1992 single-season completion record set by John Kaleo in a loss against Michigan and then the 1993 single-season passing yards record set by Scott Milanovich in the subsequent win against Rutgers, then tied Milanovich's 1993 single-season touchdowns record in the bowl win. Tagovailoa was named MVP of the 2021 Pinstripe Bowl against Virginia Tech where he went 20-of-24 with 265 passing yards and two touchdowns, along with 42 rushing yards on four carries in their 54-10 win. He led Maryland to the program's first bowl win since 2010.

College statistics

References

External links

 Maryland profile

Living people
American football quarterbacks
Alabama Crimson Tide football players
Maryland Terrapins football players
Players of American football from Hawaii
American sportspeople of Samoan descent
2000 births